Heterometrus longimanus, the Asian forest scorpion, is a species of  scorpions belonging to the family Scorpionidae.

Description
Body color is uniformly black. These scorpions are viviparous.

Distribution and habitat
This species is native to southern Asia (Malaysia, Indonesia, the Philippines, and Singapore), where it inhabits the humid tropical rainforests.

References

Scorpionidae
Animals described in 1800